The Umbutfo Eswatini Defence Force (UEDF) is the military of the Southern African Kingdom of Eswatini (Swaziland). It is used primarily during domestic protests, with some border and customs duties; the force has never been involved in a foreign conflict. The army has struggled with high rates of HIV infection. Since measures were put in place the rate is dropping.

History and structure

The UEDF replaced the Royal Swaziland Defence Force, which was created in 1973 to replace the role of the British Army following independence in 1968.

The King of Eswatini is the commander-in-chief of the Umbutfo Eswatini Defence Force, and the substantive minister of defence. However, he delegates the responsibilities of the day-to-day activities of the executive arm of the government.

There is a Defence Council, which is responsible for advising the King on all matters pertaining to the UEDF. The UEDF is commanded by Major General Stanley Dlamini; the deputy commander is Brigadier General Patrick Motsa, and the formation commander is Lieutenant General Hulumende M. Fakudze.

Ranks
Officers

Enlisted

Equipment

Armoured personnel carriers

Weapons

Branches

Air Force

Eswatini maintains a relatively small air wing, part of the Umbutfo Eswatini Defence Force. The air wing is mainly used for transporting the King as well as cargo, and personnel; surveying land with search and rescue functions, and mobilising in case of a national emergency.

Both Arava 201s have crashed; the first was on a demo flight in the 1980s, leaving both pilots dead. The second was lost in 2004, after bad weather caused the flight crew led by pilot army colonel Micheal Ranft to fail to unlock the flight controls lock pin. This caused the plane to crash into a sugar cane field after failing to rotate. Although no injuries were reported, the incident left the air force temporarily crippled.

Aircraft

Current inventory

Retired inventory

Army
The Umbutfo Eswatini Defence Force is the main component of Eswatini's military.

Facilities
 Nsingizini Army Barracks
 Mbuluzi Barracks
 Mdzimba Mountain Barracks
 Phocweni Barracks
 Cebisa Barracks
 Zombodze Barracks

Units
 Ludlalukhala Regiment
 Lindimpi Regiment (watchman/guard) 
 Gcina Regiment

Navy
Due to Eswatini being landlocked, the country does not maintain a navy.

Commanders

Notes

References

Bibliography

 Jones, Richard D. Jane's Infantry Weapons 2009/2010. Jane's Information Group; 35th edition (January 27, 2009). .
 

Eswatini
Military in Africa
Government of Eswatini